"Sunny Days" is a song by Dutch DJ and record producer Armin van Buuren. It features the vocals from American singer-songwriter Josh Cumbee. The song was released in the Netherlands by Armada Music as a digital download on 16 June 2017. The song was written by Armin van Buuren, Benno de Goeij, Afshin Salmani, Josh Cumbee, Toby Gad and Gordon Groothedde, and it was produced by van Buuren, Salmani, Cumbee, and Gad. Single received double platinum status in the Netherlands. The song serves as the second single from van Buuren's seventh album Balance.

Music video

Production
The music video was shot in Bevagna and Assisi, Italy, in three days. However, while Armin van Buuren stayed a whole week in Bevagna to write the music video, the scenes with him were shot in one day.

Track listing
Digital download
"Sunny Days" – 3:30

Digital download – extended club mix
"Sunny Days" (extended club mix) – 6:30

Charts

Weekly charts

Year-end charts

Certifications

References

2017 singles
Armin van Buuren songs
2017 songs
Songs written by Armin van Buuren
Songs written by Toby Gad
Songs written by Josh Cumbee
Song recordings produced by Josh Cumbee
Armada Music singles
Songs written by Benno de Goeij